is a Japanese manga artist associated with the Nouvelle manga movement. His book A Patch of Dreams has been translated into English by Fanfare/Ponent Mon. His manga Miyori no Mori has been turned into an anime television film.

Works 
 A Diffusion Disease (2 volumes, Kodansha Afternoon, 1995, 1998)
 Coo's World (2 volumes, Kodansha Afternoon, 2000)
 Miyori no Mori (1 volume, Akita Shoten, 2005)
 A Patch of Dreams (1 volume, Asuka Shinsha, 2005 - sequel to Coo's World)
 Miyori no Mori no Shiki (1 volume, Akita Shoten, 2007)

References

External links
Official Site

Living people
1962 births
Manga artists from Iwate Prefecture